Rich Brown (Richard J. Brown, born April 9, 1956) is the assistant clerk, former clerk, and former Democratic member of the Michigan House of Representatives.

Brown had a career in radio, for WUUN (now WFXD) in Marquette and as news director at WUPM in Ironwood, before working as a reporter for the Ironwood Daily Globe. He was also the director of the Marty's Goldenaires Senior Drum and Bugle Corps in Bessemer.

Immediately prior to his election to the House, Brown served 16 years as Gogebic County Clerk and Register of Deeds, and was named Michigan County Clerk of the Year in 1992.

References

1956 births
Living people
Democratic Party members of the Michigan House of Representatives
County officials in Michigan
People from Gogebic County, Michigan
20th-century American politicians
21st-century American politicians